Bismuth is a ghost town in the Black Hills of Custer County, South Dakota, United States.

History
Bismuth existed circa 1901 as a small community of half a dozen homes. It once included a store and a baseball team, but now only an old house remains of the town. The site is now part of a campground and a manmade lake.

Geography
Bismuth is located in the Black Hills on the northern border of Custer County. It was built just north of Iron Creek and is approximately 1.5 miles northwest of the ghost town of Spokane and five miles southeast of Mount Rushmore.

References

Geography of Custer County, South Dakota
Ghost towns in South Dakota